Euphorbia barnardii, commonly known as mokgwakgwatha, is a species of plant in the family Euphorbiaceae native to southern Africa.

References 

barnardii
barnardii